Karwice  is a hamlet in the administrative district of Gmina Drawsko Pomorskie, within Drawsko County, West Pomeranian Voivodeship, in north-western Poland.

For the history of the region, see History of Pomerania.

The hamlet has a population of roughly 20.

References

Karwice